Ras Shoukair is an area to the north of Hurghada in the Red Sea Governorate, Egypt.  There is an Oil and Gas Facility in the town with the same name. There is also an airport there; Ras Shoukair New Airport.

See also

 List of cities in Egypt

References

Populated places in Red Sea Governorate